Charles Haines may refer to:

 Charles Delemere Haines (1856–1929), American businessman and Congressman
 Charles Haines (priest), Dean of Ardfert

See also
Charles Haynes (disambiguation)